Carwalking is the act of stepping onto and walking across a stationary car. Depending on the technique and equipment used, carwalking can lead to damage of private property. It often is a response to cars being parked illegally in areas exclusively allocated to pedestrians and a protest against the negative impacts of high motorization rates in urban areas.

Reported cases

Germany
The most famous carwalker was Michael Hartmann who performed the act in Munich, Germany, in the 1980s. The peak of automobile friendly policies was around the seventies and the eighties in the western world, and such high number of motor vehicles in urban areas had as consequence a large number of cars illegally parked on side-walks and other pedestrian-reserved areas. Hartmann, in his book which describes his actions, states that once in 1988 he was walking with his girlfriend and due to many cars parked on the sidewalk, they had to continuously zigzag between the cars so he decided to walk straightforward above the cars.

United Kingdom
An initiative in Kings Heath (Birmingham) distributes posters that warn drivers their cars will be "bonneted" if parked on pavement obstructing pedestrians.

France
Another reported case happened in Lyon, France, in 2011 when Peter Wagner, a German engineer, decided to walk on top of a car that was illegally parked on the side-walk in such a manner that he could not squeeze past. At that moment the owner of the car arrived and later sued him for property damage, demanding 800 Euros for repairs. The carwalker was condemned to pay 300 Euros, but later appealed. His appeal was denied.

Mexico
In Mexico City, a pedestrian activist called Peatónito, a mix of the Spanish words for pedestrian (peatón) and astonished (atónito), is famous for walking over cars. He wears a Mexican wrestler mask, a cape and proclaims himself to be a superhero for pedestrians.

See also
Parking violation

References

External links

 
Anti-road protest
Criminal law
Parking law
Pedestrian activism
Property crimes
Protest tactics
Vehicle law
Walking